Mossbank may refer to:

Mossbank, Shetland, Scotland
Mossbank, Saskatchewan, Canada
RCAF Station Mossbank, Canada